WHRX is a Public Radio formatted broadcast radio station licensed to Nassawadox, Virginia, serving Accomac and Accomack County, Virginia.  WHRX is owned and operated by Hampton Roads Educational Telecommunications Association, Inc. and is a repeater station of WHRV.

References

External links
 WHRV Online
 

2005 establishments in Virginia
Public radio stations in the United States
NPR member stations
Radio stations established in 2005
HRX